Sondre Skogen (born 13 August 2000) is a Norwegian professional footballer who currently plays as a defender for Norwegian club Mjøndalen IF. He also represented Norway as a youth international.

Club career
Hailing from Lierne, he played youth football for Lierne, Steinkjer FK and Rosenborg BK, joining the latter in 2016.

Without making his senior league debut for Rosenborg, he was assigned squad number 39 and was benched several times before being loaned out to Jong Feyenoord in the fall of 2020. Their coach Rini Coolen had previously been academy manager and manager in Rosenborg. Skogen featured in one game before the season was cancelled. In the winter of 2021 the move was made permanent. He was sent on loan to feeder club Excelsior, and made his debut in the Eerste Divisie in March 2021 against Helmond Sport. Skogen featured seven times for Excelsior, scoring once, before returning to Feyenoord. In August 2022 Skogen left Feyenoord and returned to his homeland, joining Mjøndalen IF on a two-year deal.

International career
Skogen was a youth international for Norway, featuring four times in 2016.

References

2000 births
Living people
People from Lierne
Norwegian footballers
Norway youth international footballers
Rosenborg BK players
Feyenoord players
Excelsior Rotterdam players
Eerste Divisie players
Association football defenders
Norwegian expatriate footballers
Norwegian expatriate sportspeople in the Netherlands
Expatriate footballers in the Netherlands
Sportspeople from Trøndelag